The 1984 United States presidential election in Connecticut took place on November 6, 1984. All 50 states, as well as the District of Columbia, were part of the 1984 United States presidential election. Voters chose eight electors to the Electoral College, which selected the president and vice president of the United States.

Connecticut was won by incumbent United States President Ronald Reagan of California, who was running against former Vice President Walter Mondale of Minnesota. Reagan ran for a second time with former C.I.A. Director George H. W. Bush of Texas, and Mondale ran with Representative Geraldine Ferraro of New York, the first major female candidate for the vice presidency.

As of 2020, this was the most recent presidential election in which the Republican nominee carried the following municipalities: Ashford, Cornwall, East Hartford, Hamden, Manchester, Meriden, Newington, Norwich, Portland, Rocky Hill, West Hartford, West Haven, Windham, and Windsor.

The presidential election of 1984 was a very partisan election for Connecticut, with over 99% of the electorate voting only either Democratic or Republican, and only 4  parties appearing on the ballot.  Every county in Connecticut voted in majority for the Republican candidate.

Connecticut weighed in for this election as 2% more Republican than the national average. , this is the last election in which Hartford County voted for the Republican candidate. This is also the final time that a Republican presidential candidate was able to win every county in the state or win by a double-digit margin. Reagan won Connecticut by a 22% margin and with slightly over 60% of the vote, making it 3.7% more Republican than the nation overall amid his national landslide. Since 1896, Connecticut had generally leaned Republican, voting for losing Republican candidates in 1916, 1932, 1948, and 1976 (but also voting for Humphrey in 1968 and for Kennedy, as he only narrowly won in 1960). The basis for Republican strength in the Nutmeg State had been suburban Fairfield County, where Reagan approached 2/3 of the vote. However, Reagan also took New Haven County--the swing county amongst the state's three largest--by twenty points, and won Hartford County--generally the most Democratic-friendly of the state's three largest counties--by double digits. 

After 1996, all of Connecticut's large counties would become reliably Democratic, and the state with them. Reagan's 890,877 votes are the most received by a Republican presidential candidate in the state's history. As of 2022, this is the last time Connecticut voted more Republican than the nation at large. This is also the most recent time that Connecticut voted more Republican than Georgia, Kentucky, Ohio, and Tennessee.

Results

By county

By congressional district
Reagan won all 6 congressional districts, including three held by Democrats.

See also
 United States presidential elections in Connecticut
 Presidency of Ronald Reagan

References

Connecticut
1984
1984 Connecticut elections